William Joseph Stewart (c. 1878 – 5 March 1960) was a Labour Party politician in the United Kingdom.

He was elected at the 1935 general election as Member of Parliament (MP) for Houghton-le-Spring in County Durham, defeating the sitting Conservative MP Robert Chapman, who had won the seat in 1931.  Stewart served only one term in Parliament, standing down at the 1945 general election.

References

External links 
 

1870s births
1960 deaths
Labour Party (UK) MPs for English constituencies
Miners' Federation of Great Britain-sponsored MPs
UK MPs 1935–1945